The Invasion is the partly missing third serial of the sixth season of the British science fiction television series Doctor Who, which was first broadcast in eight weekly parts from 2 November to 21 December 1968. 

In the serial, the megalomaniac Tobias Vaughn (Kevin Stoney), the head of the hugely successful electronics company International Electromatics, forms an alliance with the Cybermen to take control of Earth.

The Invasion marks the first appearance of UNIT, the second appearance of Lethbridge-Stewart (Nicholas Courtney), now promoted to Brigadier, and introduces Corporal Benton (John Levene), later to become a sergeant during the Third Doctor's era. It was the first incomplete Doctor Who serial to be released on DVD with full-length animated reconstructions of its two missing episodes.

Plot
After being fired upon, the Doctor, Jamie and Zoe land a damaged TARDIS in London and go to find Professor Edward Travers for his assistance. They discover Professor Travers has leased his house to Professor Watkins & his niece Isobel.The professor has gone missing while working for a shadowy electronics company called International Electromatics. The Doctor and Jamie leave to investigate its head office, where they meet Tobias Vaughn, the company's Managing Director, and Brigadier Alastair Lethbridge-Stewart head of a military taskforce called UNIT, which investigates unusual activities around the world.

Taken to the company's countryside base, the Doctor and Jamie meet the Professor, who is working on a "Cerebration Mentor" device, intended to be a teaching machine. The professor reveals that Vaughn is working with an unspecified ally and that they are planning to take over the world. Further investigation reveals this ally as the Cybermen, who intend to send a hypnotic signal through the devices produced by International Electromatics, which will incapacitate the world's population and nullify resistance. In the nick of time the Doctor is able to protect his companions and their UNIT allies with specially-made depolarizers that neutralize the Cybermen's signal. As the Cybermen take over, the Brigadier arranges for the Doctor and company to be transported to UNIT headquarters in Geneva to help battle the invasion.

After completing production on more depolarizers, the Doctor leaves to confront Vaughn in London whilst UNIT works to stop the Cybermen. Uncovering Russian plans to launch a rocket at the ship sending the signals, Turner leads a squadron to assist them whilst Zoe helps the Brigadier predict the Cyberfleet's movements. Using British artillery, they are able to destroy the full fleet, causing the Cybermen to turn on Vaughn and decide to destroy Earth with a megatron bomb. His plans ruined, Vaughn agrees to thwart the invasion and helps the Doctor locate the homing signal. With UNIT sending troops to help, they defeat the Cybermen guarding the beacon and turn it off, though Vaughn is killed in an ambush. The megatron bomb is destroyed by an anti-missile defence rocket, while the Russian rocket destroys the Cybership broadcasting the hypnotic control signal, ending the invasion.

Production

Originally The Invasion was going to be a six-part story called Return of the Cybermen. The character of Professor Travers (who appeared in the two earlier Yeti stories) was to have appeared for a third time, but the decision was made to replace him with Professor Watkins as using him would involve paying Mervyn Haisman and Henry Lincoln (who were against their characters' usage after a disagreement over rewrites of The Dominators conducted without their approval), although Travers is still referenced by name several times. The sequence where Gregory describes UNIT's attack on an IE car and then is subsequently killed by a Cyberman was written into the script after time pressures prevented the production team from filming the car attack on location. (Ian Marter, however, did reinstate the lost car attack scene in his novelisation.)

Filming
Wendy Padbury does not appear in episode 3, as she was on holiday. Frazer Hines was on a scheduled break during the last episode but did appear in a pre-recorded film insert at the conclusion.

According to Frazer Hines in an interview on the audio CD of The Invasion, Sally Faulkner's skirt kept getting blown up around her neck whilst climbing up the rope ladder to the helicopter.  To avoid the same thing happening to his kilt, he remembered reading somewhere that The Queen had lead weights sewn into the hem of her skirt to stop this from happening to her.  It so happened that Frazer's dresser was a keen fisherman, who sewed some lead weights into his kilt.

This was one of the first Doctor Who serials in which scenes were recorded out of order.  This was due to the then-improved videotape editing technology.

Post-production
Due to director Douglas Camfield's refusal to use regular composer Dudley Simpson, Don Harper was hired to do the music for this serial. It would be Harper's only work with Doctor Who.

Cast notes
Kevin Stoney previously played Mavic Chen in The Daleks' Master Plan (1965–66) and would later play Tyrum in Revenge of the Cybermen (1975). Peter Halliday, who plays Packer, also supplied the voice of the Cyber-Director in all eight episodes of the serial, in addition to the Cybermen voices in the last four episodes. In addition, Halliday went on to do several other roles (both voice and acting) in several later serials in the series. Edward Burnham also portrays Professor Kettlewell in the Tom Baker serial, Robot (1974–75). Clifford Earl previously played the station sergeant in The Daleks' Master Plan. Sheila Dunn previously played Blossom Lefavre in The Daleks' Master Plan and would later play Petra Williams in Inferno. Sally Faulkner later played Miss Tremayne in the audio play Winter for the Adept. Ian Fairbairn had previously played Questa in The Macra Terror (1967) and would later play Bromley in Inferno (1970) and Doctor Chester in The Seeds of Doom (1976), both stories directed by Camfield.

Broadcast and reception

 Episode is missing

Paul Cornell, Martin Day, and Keith Topping in The Discontinuity Guide (1995) noted that the serial "shows the advantages of recognisable Earth settings" and described it as "an all action romp".  In The Television Companion (1998), David J. Howe and Stephen James Walker wrote that The Invasion was "one of the very best stories to feature the Cybermen", with praise for Stoney's Tobias Vaughn. In 2009, Patrick Mulkern of Radio Times wrote that the story was plotted with "scarcely a dull moment", with the first four episodes "grippingly plotted" to lead up to the cliffhanger of the Cybermen. Mulkern also praised the dynamic and characters of the Doctor, Jamie, and Zoe, as well as Tobias Vaughn. The A.V. Club reviewer Christopher Bahn said that the story's length allowed for "an awful lot of contrivance, drawn-out scenes, and running back and forth between locations with one group of characters just missing the other group", but it still remained enjoyable, especially because of Stoney's performance. He also noted that "there's a tendency in this story to cut corners, sometimes forgivably and sometimes not". Ultimately, Bahn felt that the story was more about Vaughn than the Cybermen and, like Mulkern, highlighted Zoe's character. DVD Talk's Stuart Galbraith gave The Invasion a rating of three and a half stars out of five, noting that it borrowed from other science fiction tales and could have been shorter, but ultimately was entertaining and delivered an "atmospheric tale full of dread and high-tension suspense". In 2013, Ben Lawrence of The Daily Telegraph named The Invasion as one of the top ten Doctor Who stories set in the contemporary time.

Commercial releases

In print

A novelisation of this serial, written by Ian Marter, was published by Target Books in May 1985. The novelisation restores material cut from the original shooting scripts including the UNIT raid to rescue Professor Watkins and Vaughn convincing Routledge to shoot himself. In this novel the Russian Air Base is named as Nikortny, a punning tribute to actor Nicholas Courtney.

Home media

As with many serials from the Troughton era, a complete version of The Invasion does not exist in the BBC's archives, as Episodes 1 and 4 were lost.  However, their soundtracks survive, recorded off-air by fans at home.

Audio 
The soundtracks for The Invasion and The Tenth Planet along with a bonus disc, The Origins of the Cybermen, an audio essay by David Banks, were released in a collector's tin called Doctor Who: Cybermen.

Video 
The story was released on BBC Video in 1993, with the missing Episodes 1 and 4 summarised on-screen by Nicholas Courtney.

In June 2006, the BBC announced that the animation studio Cosgrove Hall, who previously created the webcast Scream of the Shalka, had produced full-length animated versions of the two missing episodes. These episodes, along with newly remastered copies of the rest of the serial, were released on DVD on 6 November 2006.

Soundtrack

Re-recorded score

A re-recording of Don Harper's score for The Invasion was released 6 June 2014 on LP and 17 June 2014 on CD by Dual Planet on LP and CD under the title Cold Worlds.  Also included on the release are tracks by Harper used in Dawn of the Dead, and a 1973 recording of the Doctor Who theme music by Harper.

Track listing

Original soundtrack

Two of Harper's original tracks ("The Dark Side of the Moon" and "The Company") were included on the 4-disc edition of the album Doctor Who: The 50th Anniversary Collection, with the 11-disc edition containing an additional two ("Brigadier-Lethbridge Stewart" and "Mysteries").  The complete original score, including unused cues and Radiophonic effects by Brian Hodgson, will be released on CD and LP in 2018.  The complete original soundtrack was released on 14 September 2018. including Radiophonic effects by Brian Hodgson. It was released on LP 28 September 2018, omitting some effects.

Track listing

References

Bibliography

External links

 
 
 Doctor Who ReAnimated! – news article on the DVD release with a link to a teaser clip of the animation.
 Doctor Who Locations – The Invasion

Target novelisation

1968 British television episodes
Cybermen television stories
Doctor Who missing episodes
Doctor Who serials novelised by Ian Marter
Second Doctor serials
Television episodes set in London
UNIT serials